Falko Peschel (born January 20, 1965) is a German pedagogue and proponent of open learning. He has gained attention for his unorthodox educational experiments and publications.

References

External links
 Open Learning (in German with link to Google Translate)

German educational theorists
20th-century educational theorists
1965 births
Living people